Beşdəli (also, Beshdali and Besh-Dyali) is a village in the Zangilan Rayon, located in the south-west of the country of Azerbaijan. It was under the control of Armenian forces of the Nagorno-Karabakh, however, it was recaptured by the Azerbaijan Army on or around November 7, 2020.

References 

Populated places in Zangilan District